Willa's Wild Life is an animated television series based on Dan Yaccarino's book An Octopus Followed Me Home. The series originally aired on Qubo in the United States (and has been put back on Qubo's schedule from 2019 to 2020), YTV in Canada and TF1 and Piwi+ in France. The series is Flash-animated with Toon Boom Harmony. International airings aired from October 7, 2008 to June 27, 2013. 26 episodes were produced.

Overview
The series is about a girl named Willa (Jordan Todosey) who has a giraffe, a camel, two elephants, an alligator, and many more zoo animals.

Characters

People
 Willa (Jordan Todosey) is the main character of the series, who has many exotic animals, much to her father's discomfort. She has many wacky adventures and learns lessons along the way. Because of her adventures, she often gets into trouble. Willa is kindhearted and caring and never tries to hurt her friends' feelings. She is usually seen in a green shirt, a red dress and a green headband.
 Dooley (Samantha Reynolds) is Willa's next-door neighbour and best friend. He often gets caught up in Willa's adventures. He helps Willa learn lessons during their adventures. He is usually seen wearing a purple T-shirt, yellow pants and thick, round glasses.
 Willa's father (Peter Keleghan) is Willa's single father. He is uncomfortable with the animals around the house, but knowing how Willa cares for them, he lets her keep them. He helps Willa learn lessons along the way. He is usually seen with an orange vest, long-sleeved blue shirt, brown pants, and glasses. He loves and cares for Willa. He apparently has a crush on Ms. Vanderwinkle. His real name is never revealed. There's not enough evidence to know who Willa's mother is. Willa's parents are either divorced, or her mother died.
 Sara, Kara, and Lara are friends (for over a year) who look, dress, and act the same and think they are cooler than everyone. They often bully Willa, Dooley and Evelyn, and use the wrong names, calling Willa "Wanda/Wendy/Willetta/Wilma/Winifred/Winona" and Dooley "Danny/Dickie/Donnie/Dennis". They are members of the dance club, practice ballet and all own dogs.
Sara (Lauren Collins) has a pale skin tone and long blonde hair, red lipstick and pink fashion. She has a red poodle named Susu.
Kara (Sunday Muse) has a fair skin tone and long red hair, purple lipstick and purple fashion. She has a purple poodle named Kuku.
Lara (Alyson Court) has a tan skin tone and long brown hair, green lipstick and green fashion. She has a green poodle named Lulu.
 Evelyn (Lisa Norton) is Willa's friend. She frequently gets into Willa's adventures. She seems to be grumpy all the time and gets discouraged easily. With Willa and Dooley's help, she learns to have fun and be happy. Evelyn is tall, has red hair and is usually seen wearing a long-sleeved turquoise shirt, and capri blue jeans.
 Mr. Tremble (Dwayne Hill) is the assistant principal at Willa's class. He easily gets into Willa's adventures. He is usually seen wearing an orange toupee, a brown jacket and blue pants. When he is in Willa's adventures, he often loses his toupee.
 Ms. Delilah Vanderwinkle (Jayne Lewis) is Willa's other next-door neighbour. She is usually seen with a long-sleeved pink shirt, a flowered dress, and cat-eye glasses. She has an orange cat named Tangerine, and a nephew named Buzzy whom Willa babysits in "Baby It's You." Ms. Vanderwinkle's first name was revealed in "Willa & Dooley Sitting in a Tree."
 The Mailman appears in some episodes and is mostly scared by Gus.
 Tiffy Tootle (Alyson Court) is a famous blonde-haired girl with decorative pigtails. She makes her only appearance in "Willa's Wonderful Life", and near the end of this episode, she sees her biggest fan Willa and her family makes pizzas.

Animals
 Gus (Danny Wells) is an alligator. He is rude and obnoxious. Whenever he has a chance, he tries to eat the Bunnies, but is always caught by either Willa or one of the so many animals. He sleeps under Willa's bed. Gus is always hungry, being an alligator.
 Jenny (Yanna McIntosh) is a giraffe. She is the wisest of the animals. She helps Willa during her adventures and acts as a mother figure to Willa since Willa's mother is not around. Due to her size, Jenny sleeps outside.
 Inky (Dwayne Hill), Blinky (Jay T. Schramek), and Bob are penguins. They are the least intelligent of all the animals. Bob cannot speak, he just makes gestures accompanied by trombone sounds. They call Willa "Gladys." They are very good at ice skating. They sleep in the freezer. They also have a love for herrings, like how real-life penguins eat herrings for survival.
 Koko (Katie Bergin) is a kangaroo from Australia. She has a pink bow on her head and keeps many things in her pouch, such as makeup products, scissors and a signed photograph of a famous kangaroo named Willard Wallaby. She sleeps in the living room. Koko is the girliest of the animals.
 Steve (Dennis Fitzgerald) and Edie (Jayne Lewis) are two seals that used to be in show business before living with Willa. Steve's skin is darker than Edie's. Edie has a flower hair clip on her head. They give a performance every week in Willa's backyard and are talented musicians. They sleep in the bathtub.
 Wallace (Dwayne Hill) is a walrus. He is the oldest of all the animals. He likes to tell stories about his adventures in the Arctic before moving in with Willa. He sleeps with Steve and Edie in the bathtub.
 Samuel (Dennis Fitzgerald) is a camel. He is the most sophisticated of the animals. Willa rides on his back to school every day. He sleeps along with KoKo in the living room.
 The Bunnies are dozens of rabbits in different colours. They are green, orange, blue, pink, and many more bright colours. They do not speak but they squeak and giggle all the time. They usually give out kisses when they are happy. They sleep everywhere in the house. Almost none of them are officially named, as Willa simply refers to them as "bunny" or "the bunnies".
 Bert (Dwayne Hill) is a bear. Before he lived with Willa and the other animals he lived in Russia. He is usually seen sleeping. Bert sleeps along with KoKo and Samuel in the living room.
 Tiny (Darren Frost) and Lou (Dwayne Hill) are elephants. Of all the animals, they are the most immature. Tiny is blue and has a high-pitched voice while Lou is yellow and has a low-pitched voice. It is unknown if they are brothers. They do not like to give elephant rides unless Willa wants them to. They live in the garage.
 Susu, Kuku and Lulu are Sara, Kara and Lara's pet poodles. Susu is red, showing that she is Sara's dog. Kuku is purple, showing that she is Kara's dog. Lulu is green, showing that she is Lara's dog. Like their owners, they are snooty.
 Sparkle is Evelyn's pet spider. She is orange and red, and only appears in Spider Girl.
 Tangerine is Ms. Vanderwinkle's pet cat. Tangerine is orange, and only appears in Over the Fence.

Episodes

Awards
In 2010, Art Director Adrian Thatcher received a Daytime Creative Emmy Award for Outstanding Individual Achievement for his work on Willa's Wild Life.

References

External links
 
 
 Qubo schedule
 Qubo description

2000s Canadian animated television series
2000s French animated television series
2008 Canadian television series debuts
2008 French television series debuts
2010s Canadian animated television series
2010s French animated television series
2015 Canadian television series endings
2015 French television series endings
Canadian children's animated comedy television series
Canadian children's animated education television series
Canadian children's animated fantasy television series
Canadian children's animated supernatural television series
French children's animated comedy television series
French children's animated education television series
French children's animated fantasy television series
French children's animated supernatural television series
English-language television shows
Canadian flash animated television series
French flash animated television series
Television series by Nelvana
Canadian television shows based on children's books
French television shows based on children's books
YTV (Canadian TV channel) original programming
Animated television series about children
Animated television series about elephants